The 1973 Paris–Tours was the 67th edition of the Paris–Tours cycle race and was held on 30 September 1973. The race started in Paris and finished in Tours. The race was won by Rik Van Linden.

General classification

References

1973 in French sport
1973
1973 Super Prestige Pernod
September 1973 sports events in Europe